The ISON Airbike and Tandem Airbike are a family  of American high-wing, tractor configuration ultralight aircraft, that were available in kit form. The single-seat Airbike was introduced in 1994 and the two-seat Tandem Airbike was unveiled in 1996.

Originally produced by TEAM Aircraft of Bradyville, Tennessee, manufacturing passed to ISON Aircraft, also of Bradyville, before the end of kit production. Starting circa 2009 kits became once again available once again from Jordan Lake Aero.

Development

The single seat Airbike was designed to meet the requirements of the United States FAR 103 Ultralight Vehicles, including the maximum  empty weight. The tandem-seat model was intended to be licensed as an ultralight trainer or an amateur-built aircraft.

The name Airbike was chosen for the aircraft because it has a narrow fuselage and the pilot's feet rest on rudder pedals that are on the outside of the aircraft, in a similar manner to a motorcycle.

The Tandem Airbike retains all of the single-seater's features and has a stretched fuselage to accommodate the second seat. It uses a wing of  span with an area of 152 sq ft (14.14 sq m).

Design

Both variants feature a parasol wing constructed from wood and covered with aircraft fabric. The wing has full-span ailerons or, in the case of the two-seater, optional electrically-actuated flaperons. All controls are cable-operated. The elevator and rudder are conventional.

The fuselage is made from welded 4130 steel tube and the aircraft has conventional landing gear with tail wheel steering connected to the rudder pedals. The main landing gear utilises sprung-tubes for suspension and absorbing landing loads.

The Airbike was sold as an assembly kit. The kit included a pre-welded fuselage and tail, pre-built main wing spars and ribs, all brackets and fittings, landing gear, engine, propeller, instruments and a five-gallon fuel tank. The company estimated the time to complete the aircraft at 150 hours for the single-seater. The price in 2001 for the single-seat Airbike was US$7195

The Tandem Airbike had a factory estimated construction time of 200–300 hours or 100–150 hours if the quick-built kit option was purchased. In 2001 the kits price was US$8000 without engine or propeller.

Operational history

In December 1998 the company reported that 127 single-seaters were flying, the majority as US unregistered ultralights and 23 tandem-seaters. In July 2009 there were 45 Airbikes registered as experimental amateur-builts or light sport aircraft in the USA.

Variants
Airbike
Single seat aircraft designed for the US ultralight category. Engine options were the  Rotax 277,  Rotax 447 or  Zenoah G-25.
Tandem Airbike
Two-seat aircraft designed as an ultralight trainer or amateur-built. Standard engine was the  Rotax 503.

Specifications (Airbike with Rotax 447)

See also

References

External links

1990s United States ultralight aircraft